Todd Rex Gloria (born May 10, 1978) is an American politician serving as the 37th and current mayor of San Diego since 2020. As mayor, he is the chief executive officer in the city of San Diego. A member of the Democratic Party, he is the first person of color and the first openly gay person to serve as San Diego's mayor.

Gloria was first elected to public office representing District 3 of the San Diego City Council. He was president of the nine-member council from 2012 through 2014. In his role as council president, Gloria served as interim Mayor of San Diego from the August 2013 resignation of Mayor Bob Filner until the March 2014 inauguration of Mayor Kevin Faulconer. Gloria was then elected to represent California's 78th State Assembly district, which encompasses much of San Diego. While in the Assembly, he served as House Majority Whip.

Early life 
Gloria and his family grew up in the Clairemont neighborhood of San Diego, where his father was a gardener and his mother was a hotel maid. All four of his grandparents moved to the area because of their involvement with the military. Todd Gloria comes from a Filipino, Dutch, Puerto Rican, and Native American background.

Career 
U.S. Congresswoman Susan Davis had been Gloria's political mentor since they met in 1993, when Gloria was a freshman in high school. Davis was the director of the Aaron Price Fellows Program, a leadership program for high school students that focused on civic education and cross-cultural understanding. Mayor Gloria has spent the majority of his entire professional life serving the public. He began his career at the County of San Diego’s Health and Human Services Agency, and proceeded to join the office of Susan Davis as a community representative. In 2002, Gloria became Davis's district director, a position he held until his election to the City Council in 2008. Gloria also served as a San Diego Housing Commissioner from 2005 until 2008. Openly gay, he is also a former chairman of the San Diego LGBT Community Center and was a resident panelist on San Diego's Prostitution Impact Panel.  After this, in 2012, he was elected as the President of the City Council. One Year later, after Bob Filner resigned from office, he took office as the interim mayor.  During this time, he gained popularity and trust from his community by improving the layout of a revolutionary plan for the city’s fight against climate change, strengthening the infrastructure and offered creative resolutions to the severe homelessness of San Diego. Upon his success, he was then elected as a representative of the 78th District of the California State Assembly, and rose to the position of the Majority Whip. In the duration of his service, he established legislation to resolve heavily pressing issues in San Diego such as housing and homelessness, gun violence, and global warming. He is a member of the Tlingit Haida Indian Tribes of Alaska. Gloria completed his college education at the University of San Diego, where he was the student body president. He is also the vice chair of the California Legislative LGBT Caucus.

In December 2020 he became the 37th Mayor of San Diego.

San Diego City Council

Elections 

Gloria ran for the District 3 seat on the San Diego City Council vacated by the termed-out Toni Atkins in the 2008 election. He received a plurality of votes in the June 2008 primary, leading to a November run-off election against fellow Democrat Stephen Whitburn, a former journalist, community activist, and ally of then-District 6 Councilmember Donna Frye. Gloria defeated Whitburn with 54.3% of the vote.

In the 2012 election, Gloria ran for re-election unopposed and was re-elected in the June primary. As of his second term, District 3 included the neighborhoods of Balboa Park, Bankers Hill/Park West, Downtown San Diego, Golden Hill, Hillcrest, Little Italy, Mission Hills, Normal Heights, North Park, Old Town, and University Heights.

Tenure 

Gloria was chair of the city's Budget and Finance Committee from 2011 to 2016. Gloria represented San Diego on the San Diego Metropolitan Transit System Board and SANDAG, where he chaired the transportation committee. As the Council member for District Three, he also took charge in the merger of multiple homelessness organizations in the city of San Diego. By doing so, Gloria aimed to unify San Diego's allocated resources in the fight to end homelessness in the city.In December 2012, at its first meeting after new members took office, Gloria was unanimously elected to serve as Council President, replacing retiring President Tony Young.

On December 10, 2014, the city council voted 4–5 on a motion of whether to reappoint Gloria as council president for the new term, with Sherri Lightner joining the four council Republicans to defeat the measure. The council then voted 7–2 to appoint Lightner as council president, with Gloria and David Alvarez in opposition.

Interim Mayor 
Upon the resignation of Mayor Bob Filner on August 30, 2013, Gloria became the interim mayor of San Diego, with limited powers. This made San Diego the second largest city in the United States (after Houston) to have an openly gay mayor at that time. He served until March 3, 2014, when mayor-elect Kevin Faulconer was sworn in. While serving as interim mayor, he remained the City Councilmember for District 3 and retained the title of City Council President; however, City Council President Pro Tem Sherri Lightner carried out the duties of the Council President. Gloria was considered a possible candidate to replace Filner but chose not to run.

As interim mayor, Gloria reversed several of Filner's actions. He ordered city police and zoning code officers to resume enforcement actions against medical marijuana, re-hired lobbying firms in Sacramento and Washington that Filner had fired, and ordered public records be made more quickly and easily available to citizens.

Gloria's administration authored and released a draft of the San Diego Climate Action Plan.

California State Assembly 

On April 7, 2015, Gloria announced that he would run in 2016 for the California State Assembly 78th district seat held by Assembly Speaker Toni Atkins, who was termed out. Gloria was immediately endorsed by Atkins and by Sarah Boot, who had previously announced her own candidacy for Atkins's seat but withdrew upon Gloria's announcement. While running for State Assembly, Gloria promoted the city's climate action plan. On November 8, 2016, Gloria was easily elected over his relatively unknown Republican opponent with the second-highest margin of victory in San Diego County. He was easily re-elected in 2018 with over 70 percent of the vote in both the primary and the general elections.

Shortly after assuming office in 2016, Gloria was chosen by Speaker Anthony Rendon to join Democratic leadership in the Assembly as Assistant Majority Whip. In January 2018, he became Majority Whip.

Mayor of San Diego

Campaign 

Gloria announced his candidacy for mayor of San Diego in 2020 on January 9, 2019. Gloria's campaign focused on issues such as the housing crisis, affordability, public transportation, and climate change. Gloria was endorsed by several politicians including Governor Gavin Newsom, former Governor Jerry Brown, and San Diego City Attorney Mara Elliott.

On August 20, 2019, Gloria won the San Diego County Democratic Party's endorsement vote, allowing the party to spend money on behalf of his campaign. Gloria received 70% of the votes, exceeding the 60% required to win. Fellow democratic rivals Barbara Bry and Tasha Williamson won 14% and 3% of the votes respectively.

In August 2019, Gloria was accused of collecting funds for his 2020 re-election campaign to the State Assembly before filing his intent to run with the state in violation of state law. Gloria claimed this was a technical oversight and filed the relevant paperwork the next day.

With the Mayor being a "voter-nominated" office in San Diego, Gloria and Bry advanced to the general election as the top two vote getters from the primary. He was then elected mayor in the November 3 election, making him the first Native American and Filipino-American mayor elected in a US city of over a million people and the city's first mayor of color and the city's first openly gay mayor. He was sworn in on December 10, 2020.

Tenure 
Infrastructure

To revitalize the infrastructure of the city, Gloria proposed a budget for Fiscal Year 2023 called the “Ready to Rebuild” proposal. At just under $5 billion dollars total, the budget increased the allocation of funds to street maintenance by $27.6 million, parks and recreation services by $4.3 million, and left $55.8 million dollars from the American Rescue Plan Act money given to the city for the next fiscal year. From the budget initiatives, there are several projects underway to repair the infrastructure of the city that are part of the Capital Improvements Program (CIP). CIP functions as the plan to improve the capital and infrastructure of San Diego over several years. These projects have focus areas that provide important services for San Diego residents such as fire stations, libraries, and parks.  

Public Safety

In 2021, Gloria came up with a proposal to reform policing and public safety in San Diego. Many of the items were formed as responses to the citizens of San Diego. For one of the items, Gloria promised to adequately fund the Commission on Police Practices (CPP), which is an independent organization in charge of overseeing and investigating incidents involving the San Diego Police. There is also a clause in the proposal calling for San Diego police to refrain from using military grade weapons unless absolutely necessary. However, some parts of this proposal are not in action yet such as the Commission on Police Practices not being active and no known unconscious and implicit bias trainings being implemented for officers.  

Homelessness and Housing

After Gloria was elected, he continued his promise to address the issue of chronic homelessness making it his top priority. He proposed the use of housing with wrap-around services, making emergency shelters only available for triage, and replacing temporary shelters with permanent housing for those in need.

In 2021, Gloria proposed roughly $10 million dollars in investments aimed towards homelessness and housing in San Diego in his budget for the fiscal year. The budget allocates funds for the creation of a new department called Homelessness Strategies and Solutions. A majority of the proposed investments will go to interim shelter beds. The proposal also invests $1 million into funding for the People Assisting the Homeless Coordinated Street Outreach Program, a program that provides housing and services to homelessness residents. Rapid-rehousing programs in the city will also benefit from the proposals funding of 100 additional households and rental assistance.

Electoral history

San Diego City Council

California State Assembly

Mayor of San Diego

References

External links 

 Campaign website
 Join California Todd Gloria

|-

1978 births
21st-century American politicians
21st-century Native Americans
California politicians of Filipino descent
American mayors of Filipino descent
American people of Dutch descent
American politicians of Puerto Rican descent
Gay politicians
Haida people
Hispanic and Latino American mayors in California
Hispanic and Latino American state legislators in California
Living people
American LGBT people of Asian descent
American LGBT city council members
LGBT Hispanic and Latino American people
LGBT mayors of places in the United States
LGBT Native Americans
LGBT people from California
LGBT state legislators in California
Mayors of San Diego
Democratic Party members of the California State Assembly
Native American state legislators
San Diego City Council members
Tlingit people
21st-century LGBT people